Wilma Subra (born 1943) is an American environmental scientist. She is President of the Subra Company, an environmental consulting firm.

Subra was born in Morgan City, Louisiana, and was raised there and in nearby Bayou Vista. Her father was a chemist, and her grandfather an oyster fisherman. She obtained a bachelor's degree in microbiology and chemistry in 1965 from the University of Southwestern Louisiana in Lafayette, and her master's a year later.

From 1967 until 1981 Subra worked for the Gulf South Research Institute. She founded the Subra Company in May 1981 to help people facing problems because of environmental health issues.

Subra served for seven years as vice-chair of the Environmental Protection Agency's (EPA) National Advisory Council for Environmental Policy and Technology, for six years on the EPA's National Environmental Justice Advisory Council, and for five years on the National Advisory Committee of the US Representative to the Commission for Environmental Cooperation. She appeared in the 2010 documentary Gasland.

Awards
1999 MacArthur Fellows Program
2004 Volvo for Life Award finalist
2011 Global Exchange Human Rights Awards Honoree

References

Further reading
"Conversations with Advocates of Fair Growth" Commonweal
"Interview with CHE Partner, Wilma Subra", Collaborative on Health and the Environment
"A Letter from Wilma Subra to New York State: Fracking vs. Water", October 1, 2009
"Wilma Subra Notes from the Hurricane Impacted area", Global Community Network, September 16, 2005
Wolf, Vicki. "Wilma Subra: Chemist helping communities find justice in toxic environment", Citizens League for Environmental Action Now, February 2009.
"Wilma Subra: An unstoppable pioneer in environmental chemistry and community advocacy", Chemical & Engineering News, January 17, 2020

Environmental scientists
Living people
MacArthur Fellows
University of Louisiana at Lafayette alumni
1943 births
American scientists